Inverness Highlands South is a census-designated place (CDP) in Citrus County, Florida, United States. As of the 2010 census, the population was 6,542, up from 5,781 in 2000.

Geography
Inverness Highlands South is located in eastern Citrus County at  (28.799492, -82.330549), along the southern border of the city of Inverness, the county seat. The western edge of the CDP runs along the border of Withlacoochee State Forest.

Demographics

As of the census of 2000, there were 5,781 people, 2,557 households, and 1,792 families residing in the CDP. The racial makeup of the CDP was 95.83% White, 1.73% African American, 0.35% Native American, 0.69% Asian, 0.02% Pacific Islander, 0.57% from other races, and 0.81% from two or more races. Hispanic or Latino of any race were 4.95% of the population.

There were 2,557 households, out of which 21.4% had children under the age of 18 living with them, 58.7% were married couples living together, 8.5% had a female householder with no husband present, and 29.9% were non-families. 26.6% of all households were made up of individuals, and 17.1% had someone living alone who was 65 years of age or older.  The average household size was 2.25 and the average family size was 2.66.

In the CDP, the population was spread out, with 19.1% under the age of 18, 4.7% from 18 to 24, 21.3% from 25 to 44, 21.5% from 45 to 64, and 33.4% who were 65 years of age or older.  The median age was 50 years. For every 100 females, there were 88.4 males.  For every 100 females age 18 and over, there were 84.6 males.

The median income for a household in the CDP was $28,289, and the median income for a family was $34,647. Males had a median income of $27,742 versus $23,097 for females. The per capita income for the CDP was $19,362.  About 6.3% of families and 9.0% of the population were below the poverty line, including 18.5% of those under age 18 and 7.4% of those age 65 or over.

Education
The CDP is served by Citrus County Schools. Elementary schools serving sections of the CDP include Inverness and Pleasant Grove. All residents are zoned to Inverness Middle School, and Citrus High School.

References

Census-designated places in Citrus County, Florida
Census-designated places in Florida